The Sholay Girl is a 2019 Hindi-language biographical period drama film directed by Aditya Sarpotdar and produced by Shrabani Deodhar, Sai Deodhar and Shakti Anand. Written by Faizal Akhtar and Shrabani Deodhar, the film is based on India's first stuntwoman, Reshma Pathan. Bidita Bag portrays Pathan's role while Chandan Roy Sanyal, Prince Rodde and Aditya Lakhia appear in supporting roles.

The title refers to Sholay, in which Pathan worked as a stunt double for Hema Malini.
To prepare for the role, Bag took training in martial arts. She also said that she watched the tonga scene from Sholay "at least a 100 times to master the role." The official trailer was released on 3 March 2019 and the film was released on 8 March, the International Women's Day on the online streaming platform ZEE5.

Cast 
 Bidita Bag as Reshma Pathan
Spandan Chaturvedi as young Reshma Pathan
Dhrisha Kalyani as Reshma's younger sister
 Chandan Roy Sanyal as Azeem Bhaai 
 Prince Rodde as Young Ramesh Sippy
 Vineet Raina as Shakoor
 Sujata Sehgal as Reshma's mother
 Aditya Lakhia as Reshma's father
 Saharsh Shukla as Saajid
 Reshma Pathan as herself- Special appearance

Reception 
Nandini Ramnath of Scroll.in called it "an undeniably uplifting biopic that pays tribute to Reshma’s daring and can-do spirit". But she felt that the film "softens the rough edges and underplays the exploitative conditions under which she often worked." Alcheesh Kushwaha of NDTV praised Bag's performance. He then wrote: "In the one hour 25-minute film, with the colloquy, trickle and resonance of Reshma, the whole story of adventurer and Himmatwali Stantwoman explains in the sequels." Arushi Jain of The Indian Express called the film a "compelling watch" and praised Bag's acting calling her "effortless in her spot on performance as Reshma."

References

External links 

Indian films based on actual events
2019 biographical drama films
Films about women in India
Indian biographical drama films
Sholay
Films about stunt performers
Films about Bollywood
ZEE5 original films
Films directed by Aditya Sarpotdar
2019 direct-to-video films
2019 films
2019 drama films